Forest Research Institute may refer to:

India
Forest Research Institute (India)
Arid Forest Research Institute
Himalayan Forest Research Institute
Kerala Forest Research Institute
Rain Forest Research Institute
Tropical Forest Research Institute

Other countries
Bangladesh Forest Research Institute
Finnish Forest Research Institute
Forest Research Institute Malaysia
New Zealand Forest Research Institute
Ontario Forest Research Institute, Canada
Papua New Guinea Forest Research Institute

See also
List of forest research institutes
List of forest research institutes in India

Δ